

A
A/B tester
Application analyst

B 

 Business analyst

C
Computer operator
Computer repair technician
Computer scientist
Computer analyst

D
Data entry clerk
Database administrator
Data analyst
Data designer
Data scientist

H 

 Hardware engineer

I
Information systems technician
IT assistant
IT consultant

N
Network analyst
Network administrator

P
Programmer
Product manager
Project manager

R 

 Rapid prototyper

S
Scrum master
Security engineer
Software analyst
Software architect
Software design
Software engineer
Software project manager
Software quality analyst
Software test engineer (Tester)
Solution architect
Support technician (Help Desk)
System administrator
Systems analyst
Systems architect

T
Test engineer

U
User experience designer
User interaction designer
User researcher

V 

Video game developer 
Visual designer
Virtual assistant

W
Web developer
Website administrator

External links
Bureau of Labor Statistics jobs list database in text

Computer